Santa Rita Peak is a mountain located in the Diablo Range of California in San Benito County, a short distance to the west of the Fresno County line and  southeast of San Benito Mountain. Cantua Creek has its source on its northern slope. The San Benito River has its source on its southeastern slopes.

References 

Mountains of San Benito County, California
Diablo Range
Mountains of Northern California